Valoneic acid is a hydrolysable tannin. It is a component of some hydrolysable tannins such as mallojaponin.

The difference with its isomer sanguisorbic acid is that the hydroxyl that links the hexahydroxydiphenoyl (HHDP) group to the galloyl group belongs to the HHDP group.

It can be chemically synthesized.

See also 
 Sanguisorbic acid
 Valonea (Quercus macrolepis)
 Valoneic acid dilactone

References

External links 
 Plant polyphenols: vegetable tannins revisited, page 136 by Edwin Haslam

Ellagitannins
Biphenyls
Dihydroxybenzoic acids
Trihydroxybenzoic acids
Catechols
Pyrogallols
Diphenyl ethers